The One Hundred Seventh Ohio General Assembly was the legislative body of the state of Ohio in 1967 and 1968. In this General Assembly, both the Ohio Senate and the Ohio House of Representatives were controlled by the Republican Party.  In the Senate, there were 23 Republicans and 10 Democrats. In the House, there were 61 Republicans and 38 Democrats. It was the first General Assembly to take effect after the Voting Rights Act of 1965 required population proportioned districts. The seats were apportioned in 1966.

Senate

Leadership

Majority leadership
 President of the Senate: John W. Brown
 President pro tempore of the Senate: Theodore Gray
 Majority Whip: Michael Maloney

Minority leadership
 Leader: Frank W. King
 Assistant Leader: Oliver Ocasek

Members of the 107th Senate

House of Representatives

Leadership
Speaker of the House: Charles Kurfess

Members of the 107th House of Representatives

Appt.- Member was appointed to current House Seat

See also
 List of Ohio state legislatures

References
Ohio House of Representatives official website
Project Vote Smart – State House of Ohio
Map of Ohio House Districts
Ohio District Maps 2002–2012
2006 election results from Ohio Secretary of State

Ohio legislative sessions
Ohio
Ohio
1967 in Ohio
1968 in Ohio